"Mother" is a song by American singer-songwriter Meghan Trainor from the deluxe edition of her fifth major-label studio album, Takin' It Back (2022). Trainor wrote the song with Sean Douglas, Gian Stone and Justin Trainor. Epic Records will release the song as a single on March 27, 2023. It samples the 1954 song "Mr. Sandman", written by Pat Ballard.

Background
Meghan Trainor released two major-label studio albums in 2020, her third, Treat Myself, and her fourth, A Very Trainor Christmas. She struggled while creating the former, rewriting it four times as an attempt to "adapt to what's going on in the music industry" after its preceding singles underperformed. After Trainor's 2014 song "Title" attained viral popularity on video-sharing service TikTok in 2021, she announced her intention to pivot to the doo-wop sound of its 2015 parent album of the same name on her fifth one, in May the following year, along with her pregnancy's influence on it. 

"Bad for Me", was released as the lead single from it on June 24, 2022, and features guest vocals from American singer-songwriter Teddy Swims. "Made You Look" was released as the second single. The song went viral on TikTok. It became Trainor's first song since 2016 to enter the top 40 on the US Billboard Hot 100 and her first top-10 single on the UK Singles Chart in seven years, reaching the top 10 in other countries including Australia and New Zealand.

Recording and release 
"Mother" was written by Trainor, Sean Douglas, Gian Stone, Justin Trainor, and Pat Ballard. The song serves as the first single from the deluxe edition of her fifth major-label studio album, Takin' It Back (2022),  and will be sent to hot adult contemporary radio stations in the United States on March 27, 2023. Its release followed the announcement of Trainor's first book, which is also themed around motherhood, called Dear Future Mama. She announced the release of "Mother" when she was 21 weeks pregnant. 

Trainor shared a clip dancing to the song with TikTok influencer Chris Olsen and her husband Daryl Sabara, which featured an interpolation of the 1954 song "Mr. Sandman" and the lyrics "I am your mother/ You listen to me/ Stop all that mansplainin'/ No one's listenin/ Tell me who gave you permission to speak/ I am your mother/ You listen to me." The snippet garnered criticism from online critics, who accused her of making music solely to go viral on TikTok, and a viral tweet accused her of participating in the "TikTokification of pop music".

Music video 
A music video for the song was released on March 10, 2023, featuring a cameo from Kris Jenner. The colorful aesthetics of the video are visually similar to previous music videos of her songs from Takin' It Back, including "Made You Look" and "Don't I Make It Look Easy". The video was directed and choreographed by Charm La'Donna.

Charts

Release history

References

2023 singles
2023 songs
Epic Records singles
Meghan Trainor songs
Songs with feminist themes
Songs written by Meghan Trainor
Songs written by Pat Ballard
Songs written by Sean Douglas (songwriter)